Paraphlepsius irroratus, known generally as bespeckled leafhopper, is a species of leafhopper in the family Cicadellidae. Other common names include the irrorate leafhopper and brown-speckled leafhopper.

References

Further reading

External links

 

Insects described in 1830
Pendarini